Wombourne is a civil parish in the district of South Staffordshire, Staffordshire, England. It contains 29 listed buildings that are recorded in the National Heritage List for England. Of these, five are at Grade II*, the middle of the three grades, and the others are at Grade II, the lowest grade.  The parish contains the large village of Wombourne, the smaller village of Orton, and the surrounding area.  In the parish is a country house, The Wodehouse, which is listed, together with a number of associated structures.  The Staffordshire and Worcestershire Canal runs through the parish, and the listed buildings associated with it are bridges, locks, a weir, and a toll house.  Most of the other listed buildings are houses and associated structures, cottages, farmhouses and farm buildings.  The rest of the listed buildings include a church, two road bridges, a watermill. a water pumping station, and a war memorial.


Key

Buildings

References

Citations

Sources

Lists of listed buildings in Staffordshire
Listed buildings